The 2006 SEC women's basketball tournament took place March 2–5, 2006 in Little Rock, Arkansas at the Alltel Arena.

Tennessee Lady Vols won the tournament and received the SEC's automatic bid to the NCAA tournament by beating LSU on March 5, 2006 by the score of 63 to 62.

Seeds

Tournament

All-Tournament team 
Sylvia Fowles, LSU (So.)
Sherill Baker, Georgia (Sr.)
Seimone Augustus, LSU (Sr.)
Candace Parker, Tennessee (Fr.)-MVP
Sidney Spencer, Tennessee (Jr.)

See also
2006 SEC men's basketball tournament

References

External links
 

2005–06 Southeastern Conference women's basketball season
SEC women's basketball tournament
Sports in Little Rock, Arkansas
SEC Women's Basketball
College sports tournaments in Arkansas